Cymindis hingstoni is a species of ground beetle in the subfamily Harpalinae. It was described by Andrewes in 1930.

References

hingstoni
Beetles described in 1930